USNS Comfort (T-AH-20) is a  of the United States Navy.

Comforts duties include providing emergency, on-site care for U.S. combatant forces deployed in war or other operations. Operated by the Military Sealift Command, Comfort provides rapid, flexible, and mobile medical and surgical services to support Marine Corps Air-Ground Task Forces and Army and Air Force units deployed ashore, and naval amphibious task forces and battle forces afloat. Secondarily, she provides mobile surgical hospital service for use by appropriate U.S. government agencies in disaster or humanitarian relief or limited humanitarian care incident to these missions or peacetime military operations. Comfort is more advanced than a field hospital but less capable than a traditional hospital on land.

From 30 March to 30 April 2020, Comfort was stationed in New York City to help combat the city's coronavirus pandemic by treating non-coronavirus, and later on, coronavirus-positive patients.

Complement 
The USNS prefix identifies Comfort as a non-commissioned ship owned by the U.S. Navy and operationally crewed by civilians from the Military Sealift Command (MSC). A uniformed naval hospital staff and naval support staff is embarked when Comfort is deployed, said staffs consisting primarily of naval officers from the Navy's Medical Corps, Dental Corps, Medical Service Corps, Nurse Corps, and Chaplain Corps, and naval enlisted personnel from the Hospital Corpsman rating and various administrative and technical support ratings (e.g., Yeoman, Personnel Specialist, Information Systems Technician, Religious Program Specialist, etc.).

In accordance with the Geneva Conventions, Comfort and her crew carry no offensive weapons. Firing upon Comfort would be considered a war crime as the ship only carries weapons for self-defense. In keeping with her status as a non-combatant vessel, naval personnel from the combat specialties are not assigned as regular crew or staff. Underway embarks by Navy Unrestricted Line officers (e.g., warfare qualified combat specialties), enlisted Naval Aviation, Surface Warfare, Submarine Warfare, Special Operations or Special Warfare/SEAL personnel, or any Marine Corps officers or enlisted personnel, are typically limited to official visits, helicopter or tilt-rotor flight operations or as patients.

Construction and conversion

Like her sister ship , Comfort was built as a  oil tanker in 1976 by the National Steel and Shipbuilding Company. Her original name was SS Rose City and she was launched from San Diego, California. She is the third United States Navy ship to bear the name Comfort, and the second Mercy-class hospital ship. Her career as an oil tanker ended when she was delivered to the U.S. Navy on 1 December 1987. 

After a quarter-century in Baltimore, Maryland, Comfort changed her homeport to Naval Station Norfolk in Norfolk, Virginia in March 2013. The move placed the ship closer to supplies, much of which come from Naval Medical Center Portsmouth, and to medical crew. Savings to the U.S. Navy are estimated at $2 million per year.

Deployments

Persian Gulf War (1990–91)

During the Persian Gulf War's Operation Desert Storm, Comfort received a call to activate for Desert Shield/Desert Storm 9 August 1990 and departed Baltimore 11 August. Comfort was positioned in proximity to Kuwait, just off the coast of Saudi Arabia near Khafji. On 12 March 1991, Comfort was under way on her return trip home. She arrived in Baltimore on 15 April 1991. Other notable benchmarks include: more than 2,100 safe helicopter activities; 7,000 prescriptions filled; 17,000 laboratory tests completed; 1,600 eyeglasses made; 800,000 meals served and 1,340 radiographic studies, including 141 CT scans.

Operation Sea Signal (1994)

Comfort was ordered to activation to serve as migrant processing center for Haitian migrants in 1994. During this mission, Comfort served as the first afloat migrant processing center. She set out for the Caribbean with a crew of 928 military and civilian personnel from various federal government and international agencies. On 16 June 1994 the first Haitian migrants were taken aboard. Over the months deployed, the population onboard swelled to 1,100. Shortly after, Comfort was ordered to discontinue processing and sailed for Guantanamo Bay Naval Base, Cuba to drop off the remaining 400 migrants.

Operation Uphold Democracy (1994)

On 2 September 1994, Comfort was again directed to activate for an unprecedented second deployment. Comfort was tasked to provide a 250-bed medically intensive patient capability for the 35,000 Cuban and Haitian migrants supported by Naval Station Guantanamo Bay, Cuba. Comfort departed Naval Base Norfolk, Virginia, with a specially configured crew of 566 personnel. Following the diplomatic agreement reached between the United States and Haiti, Comfort took up a position off Port-au-Prince ready to receive casualties that might result from the transfer of U.S. and allied forces ashore. From 16 September through 2 October 1994, Comfort personnel provided both medical and surgical support to U.S. and allied forces ashore and afloat, emergency humanitarian care to injured Haitian citizens, and participated in various aspects of the Civil Affairs Program in an effort to aid the rebuilding effort of the local healthcare system. She returned to Norfolk on 14 October 1994.

Operation Noble Eagle (2001)

Comfort was activated the afternoon of 11 September 2001, in response to the terrorist attack on the World Trade Center and sailed the next afternoon to serve as a 250-bed hospital facility at Pier 92 in midtown Manhattan. The ship arrived at Pier 92 in Manhattan at about 8:30 p.m. 14 September. That evening a small number of relief workers arrived aboard the ship. As word about the ship spread, more workers began arriving over the next few days. The ship's clinic saw 561 guests for cuts, respiratory ailments, fractures, and other minor injuries, and Comforts team of Navy psychology personnel provided 500 mental health consultations to relief workers. Comfort also hosted a group of volunteer New York area massage therapists who gave 1,359 therapeutic medical massages to ship guests.

Iraq War (2002–03)

Comfort was ordered to activate on 26 December 2002, and set sail for the U.S. Central Command area of operations on 6 January 2003. After stopping in Diego Garcia to embark additional medical personnel flown in from the National Naval Medical Center, the ship proceeded to the Persian Gulf to serve as an afloat trauma center in support of Operation Iraqi Freedom. Comfort remained in the Persian Gulf for 56 days providing expert medical care to wounded U.S. military personnel as well as injured Iraqi civilians and enemy prisoners of war. When Comfort returned to Baltimore on 12 June 2003, it marked the completion of a nearly six-month activation. During this time, the ship conducted more than 800 helicopter deck landings to bring aboard personnel, patients, and cargo. Comforts Medical Treatment Facility had also performed 590 surgical procedures, transfused more than 600 units of blood, developed more than 8,000 radiographic images, and treated nearly 700 patients, including almost 200 Iraqi civilians and enemy prisoners of war.

Hurricane Katrina (2005)

Comfort deployed on 2 September 2005, after only a two-day preparation, to assist in Gulf Coast recovery efforts after the devastation of Hurricane Katrina. Starting in Pascagoula, Mississippi and then sailing to New Orleans, Comfort personnel saw 1,956 patients total. She returned on 13 October 2005 after a 7-week deployment.

Partnership for the Americas (2007)
Comforts Partnership for the Americas humanitarian mission, which began on 15 June 2007, was a major component of the President's "Advancing the Cause of Social Justice in the Western Hemisphere" initiative. Comfort visited 12 Central American, South American, and Caribbean nations where her embarked medical crew provided free health care services to communities in need. The missions objective was to offer valuable training to U.S. military personnel while promoting U.S. goodwill in the region. In all, the civilian and military medical team treated more than 98,000 patients, provided 386,000 patient encounters and performed 1,100 surgeries.
The embarked medical crew was made up of more than 500 military and non-governmental organization (Project Hope and Operation Smile) doctors, nurses, and healthcare professionals. Their primary focus was to support medical humanitarian assistance efforts ashore. A secondary mission was outpatient shipboard health service support.
Also supporting Comforts medical mission was a SEABEE detachment from the East Coast-based Mobile Construction Battalion Maintenance Unit 202, which performed civic action repair and minor construction projects in the host countries. Also on the deployment was the U.S. Navy Showband from Norfolk, Virginia, which performed in each port.

Comfort was operated and navigated by a crew of 68 civil service mariners (CIVMARS) from the U.S. Navy's Military Sealift Command (MSC).
This mission incorporated various non-government organizations and government agencies, such as Operation Smile, Project Hope, LDS Humanitarian Services, the Atlanta Rotary Club, U.S. Air Force, U.S. Coast Guard, U.S. Army, U.S. Health and Human Services and the Canadian Armed Forces.
Patient encounters included a single patient receiving multiple treatments, students in training sessions, and even veterinary care services.
Dentists and staff treated 25,000 patients, extracting 300 teeth, and performing 4,000 fillings, 7,000 sealings, and 20,000 fluoride applications. In addition to treating patients, bio-medical professionals fixed about a thousand pieces of medical equipment at local health facilities. The ship's crew also delivered nearly $200,000 worth of donated humanitarian aid.

Operation Unified Response (2010)

On 13 January 2010, Comfort was ordered to assist in the humanitarian relief efforts following the 2010 Haiti earthquake as part of Operation Unified Response. Three days later on 16 January Comfort left the Port of Baltimore bound for Haiti. She arrived Wednesday, 20 January 2010 and began medical treatment early that day. The deployment marks the first time the ship has reached full operational capacity, utilizing all 12 operating rooms and 1,000 beds, since she was delivered to the Navy in 1987. The mission also saw the ship's first on-board delivery, of a 4-pound, 5-ounce premature baby named Esther. Although the ship is less capable than a traditional hospital on land, she offered the most advanced medical care available in Haiti following the earthquake.
Between 19 January and 28 February 2010 the ship's staff treated 1,000 Haitian patients and performed 850 surgeries. By 8 March 2010, Comfort had discharged the last patient. On 10 March 2010, the ship ended her mission in the Joint Task Force Haiti area as part of Operation Unified Response, and returned to her home port.

Operation Continuing Promise (2011)
In 2011, the ship deployed on Operation Continuing Promise. The ship deployed for five months providing medical and surgical services to nine locations in the Caribbean and Latin America – Jamaica, Peru, Ecuador, Colombia, El Salvador, Nicaragua, Guatemala, Costa Rica, and Haiti. The ship's crew set up medical and surgical civil action program sites. These temporary medical clinics included primary care, internal medicine, obstetrics, and pediatric physicians as well as optometry, physical therapy, dental, radiology, laboratory, and pharmacy services. On board the ship general surgery, ophthalmology, oral and maxillofacial, and orthopedic surgeries were performed on pre-screened patients.

The mission included a Navy SeaBee (Construction Battalion) Unit, a Navy helo squadron, the United States Navy Band and a Navy Security Force unit. US Army veterinarians and veterinary technicians, US Air Force biomedical repair technicians, and dentists and dental technicians from the Canadian Navy also participated.

Although it was primarily a medical/humanitarian mission, several programs and projects, commonly referred to as Community Relations (COMREL) projects were also provided to the local populace throughout the mission. Veterinarians worked with local farmers on pest control and vaccinations, SeaBees completed building improvements in local schools and other facilities, Navy Band was a staple in all programs involving US military personnel and local government officials.

Hurricane Maria (2017)
On 29 September 2017, the ship set sail for Puerto Rico to bring assistance to the island after Hurricane Maria had hit it nine days earlier. She arrived the evening of 3 October 2017. While in San Juan, Comfort hosted a summit with key stakeholders to synchronize efforts for the ship's mission throughout the area. The ship's 835 personnel partnered with Federal DMAT teams DMAT/COMFORT partnership and evaluated 6,003 patients, 1,912 patients were sent to Comfort 290 patients admitted, and 192 surgeries performed. She provided over 40,000 lab tests, over 16,000 prescriptions, 343 CT scans, and 1,169 radiology studies. Dental services provided acute dental care for 312 patients. However, she was there to support the sickest patients on the island. Comforts 50-bed ICU had the highest acuity patients of any military hospital in the world. The ship acted as a support structure for all the islands hospitals taking their sickest ICU patients, the only oxygen producing plant on the island, she filled every hospital's oxygen tanks to help them support their patients. Additionally her sterilizers were used to sterilize, clean, and wrap surgery kits for multiple hospitals, using her ability to be a force multiplier allowing other hospitals to continue to provide care, and surgeries while they stabilized their power and facilities. She provided life saving care, including dialysis as well as fixed dialysis shunts and placed portacath shunts as the only working interventional radiology capability. This along with partnering with Puerto Rico's Health Department was able to diagnose cancers and assist in getting patients started on cancer therapy. She even had two births on board after receiving mothers who had been in labor in hallways for days. Her skilled providers provided necessary orthopedic surgeries, provided CT scans for her patients or ones referred from one of the other over 60 hospitals on island. This was at a cost of about $180,000 a day. As the island infrastructure improved the admission rate to the ship declined to 1% of patients presenting, she was ordered home on 17 November.

Operation Enduring Promise (2018) 

In October 2018, Comfort departed for an eleven-week operation in Latin America, with a primary mission being to assist countries that received refugees who fled the crisis in Venezuela. The main goal was to relieve health systems in Colombia, Ecuador, Peru and Honduras, which faced the arrival of thousands of Venezuelan migrants. She provided care for nearly 27,000 patients and performed 599 surgeries in 23 clinical days in five stops in four countries.

New York COVID-19 response (2020) 

Comfort began deployment from Norfolk, Virginia, to New York Harbor on 28 March to help deal with the impact of the COVID-19 pandemic. Comfort arrived in New York on 30 March 2020. Initially, her mission was to treat patients who did not have the virus, freeing up land-based hospitals to focus on patients with COVID-19. But later half of the ship's 1000 beds were removed so that she could isolate and treat coronavirus patients. On 6 April 2020, COVID-19 patients were allowed onto the ship. One day later, the Navy announced that one crew member aboard Comfort had tested positive for the coronavirus and that several other crew members were put into isolation.

On 17 April the U.S. Northern Command announced that "the USNS COMFORT is prepared to admit patients within a one-hour traveling radius from the ship", and preparations were made to receive coronavirus patients from the Philadelphia area. On 21 April, Governor Andrew Cuomo told President Donald Trump that the ship was no longer needed in New York. Comfort departed on 30 April, having treated 179 patients.

Awards and decorations
 Combat Action Ribbon – (26 Feb 1991)
 Joint Meritorious Unit Award – (Apr 1991–Dec 1996) Operation Provide Comfort
 Navy Unit Commendation – (Aug 1990–Mar 1991, May–Jul 1994)
 Navy Meritorious Unit Commendation – (Sep 1994–Mar 1995, Sep 2001–Jun 2005, Jun–Oct 2007)
 Armed Forces Expeditionary Medal – (Sep–Oct 1994)
 Southwest Asia Service Medal – (Aug 1990–Mar 1991)
 Humanitarian Service Medal – (Sep–Oct 2001, Sep–Oct 2005, Jan–Feb 2010, Sep–Nov 2017)

In 2008, the United Seamen's Service at its annual Admiral of the Ocean Sea Awards (AOTOS) event honored the masters and crews of hospital ships Comfort and Mercy with special Humanitarian Service Recognition Mariner's Plaques for their respective four-month humanitarian deployments to Latin America and the Caribbean in 2007 and Southeast Asia and the Pacific in 2008.

General characteristics
 Specifications
 Displacement:
 Full Load: 69,390 Tons
 Light: 24,275 Tons
 Length:
 Overall: 894 Feet (272.6 Meters)
 Waterline:  Feet (260.6 Meters)
 Beam:  Feet (32.25 Meters)
 Draft:  Feet (10.0 Meters)
 Propulsion: 1 Steam Turbine, 2 Boilers, 1 Shaft, 
 Speed: 17.5 Knots
 Range: 13,400 Nautical Miles (24,817 Kilometers) at 
 Personnel:
 Merchant Marine: 16 ROS; 61 Active
 Navy Communications & Support: 58 (6 Officers, 52 Enlisted)
 Medical and Dental (Active Only): 1,156
 Aviation: Helicopter Landing Platform, 1 Spot
 Radars: SPS-67 Surface Search
 Patient capacity:
 Intensive care wards: 80 beds
 Recovery wards: 20 beds
 Intermediate care wards: 280 beds
 Light care wards: 120 beds
 Limited care wards: 500 beds
 Total Patient Capacity: 1000 beds
 Operating Rooms: 12
 Departments and facilities:
 Casualty reception
 Intensive care unit
 Radiological services
 Main laboratory plus satellite lab
 Blood bank
 Central sterile receiving
 Medical supply/pharmacy
 Physical therapy and burn care
 Dental services
 Optometry/lens lab
 Morgue
 Laundry
 Oxygen producing plants (two)
 Medical Photography
 Four distilling plants to make drinking water from sea water ( per day)

References

Notice: This article incorporates material taken from the public domain website of USNS Comfort at Comfort.navy.mil.

External links

 USNS Comfort Command Home Page
 

 

1976 ships
2010 Haiti earthquake relief
Hurricane Katrina disaster relief
Landmarks in Baltimore
Comfort 3
Comfort 3
Merchant ships of the United States
Tankers of the United States
COVID-19 pandemic in New York City
Hospital ships involved in the COVID-19 pandemic